Pei Ji may refer to:

Pei Ji (Sui and Tang) (570–629), Chinese official of the Sui and Tang dynasties
Pei Ji (Late Tang) (died 811), Chinese official of the Tang Dynasty